Arcanite is a potassium sulfate mineral with formula: K2SO4.

Arcanite was first described in 1845 for an occurrence in old pine railroad ties in the Santa Ana tin mine, Trabuco Canyon, Santa Ana Mountains, Orange County, California, US. It has also been reported from hydrothermal deposits in the Cesano geothermal field, Latium, Italy; in bat guano on the Chincha Islands of Peru; and in caves in Western Australia, South Africa and Namibia.

References

Sulfate minerals
Potassium minerals
Orthorhombic minerals
Minerals in space group 62